Uganda Broadcasting Corporation (UBC) is the public broadcaster network of Uganda.  It was founded as a result of the "Uganda Broadcasting Corporation Act, 2004", which merged the operations of Uganda Television (UTV) and Radio Uganda. It started broadcasting on November 16, 2005.

The Uganda Broadcasting Corporation Act stated that the UBC should be funded by the levying of a television licence fee.  Collection of a licence fee set at USh  (around €8.40 or US$10.80) started in 2005.  However, collection was subsequently halted by President Yoweri Museveni.  There has since been  pressure to reinstate the licence fee to maintain UBC's independence. UBC operates the UBC TV channel and five radio stations.

Until May 2011, Edward Musinguzi was the managing director. He was fired along with all of the governing board for "massive corruption" involving unpaid salaries, the sale of land owned by the corporation, and advertisements sold during the 2010 World Cup.

Location
The broadcast studios and main offices of UBC are located at 17–19 Nile Avenue, Nakasero Hill, in Kampala, Uganda's capital and largest city. The geographic coordinates of Uganda Broadcasting Corporation headquarters are: 0°18'59.0"N, 32°35'21.0"E (Latitude:0.316389; Longitude:32.589167).

Re-organization
When he assumed office in 2016, Frank Tumwebaze, the Information and ICT Minister, established an ad-hoc committee to look into the affairs of the broadcaster. The ad-hoc committee found that UBC was in debt and had too many employees, whom it paid poorly and utilized them sub-optimally, among other infractions.

A team was set up to address the short-comings. The pay-roll was reduced from 525 to 349 people. To weed out the 176 who need to be let go, all 525 members of staff were instructed to re-apply, if interested. Those who opt for retirement or early retirement would be provided with appropriate retirement packages.

The changes, which are expected to take effect starting July 2018, are projected to reduce the wage bill from USh 4.5 billion (approximately US$1.25 million) annually to USh 3.5 billion (approximately US$955,000).

In October 2018, the company hired Maurice Mugisha, formerly "Head of News Production" at NTV Uganda, to serve as its new Deputy Managing Director.

References

External links
 Uganda Broadcasting Corporation
2010 Report covering the history of the Corporation

Publicly funded broadcasters
Government-owned companies of Uganda
Mass media companies of Uganda
1953 establishments in Uganda
1963 establishments in Uganda
Television channels and stations established in 2005
State media
Organisations based in Kampala
Companies based in Kampala